Marigold is a 1938 British drama film directed by Thomas Bentley and starring Sophie Stewart, Patrick Barr, Phyllis Dare, Edward Chapman and Pamela Stanley. The film was set in Scotland in the Victorian era. It was filmed in Edinburgh. It was based on a 1914 play of the same title by Lizzie Allen Harker and Francis R. Pryor.

Cast
 Sophie Stewart as Marigold Sellar  
 Patrick Barr as Lieutenant Archie Forsyth  
 Phyllis Dare as Mme. Marly  
 Edward Chapman as Mordan  
 Nicholas Hannen as Major Sellar  
 Hugh Dempster as Bobbie Townsend  
 Pamela Stanley as Queen Victoria  
 Ian McLean as James Paton  
 Elliott Mason as Beenie  
 Katie Johnson as Sarita Dunlop  
 James Hayter as Peter Cloag

Bibliography
 Harper, Sue. Picturing the Past: The Rise and Fall of the British Costume Film. British Film Institute, 1994.

References

1938 films
1930s historical drama films
British historical drama films
Films shot at Associated British Studios
1930s English-language films
Films set in Scotland
Films shot in England
Films set in the Victorian era
Cultural depictions of Queen Victoria on film
Films set in the 1840s
Films directed by Thomas Bentley
British films based on plays
British black-and-white films
1938 drama films
1930s British films